Drug films are films that depict either illicit drug distribution or drug use, whether as a major theme, such as by centering the film around drug subculture or by depicting it in a few memorable scenes. Drug cinema ranges from gritty social realism depictions to the utterly surreal depictions in art film and experimental film.

Some filmmakers create unabashedly pro- or anti-drug works, while others are less judgmental, allowing the viewer to draw their own conclusions. Drugs commonly shown in such films include cocaine, heroin and other opioids, LSD, cannabis (see stoner film) and methamphetamine.

There is extensive overlap with crime films, which sometimes treat drugs as plot devices to keep the action moving.

The following is a partial list of drug films and the substances involved.

0–9 
 1. Mai – Helden bei der Arbeit (2008) – MDMA
 10 To Midnight (1983) – cannabis
 21 Grams (2003) – cocaine
 21 Jump Street (2012) – HFS (a fictional drug), cannabis
 22 Jump Street (2014) – WHYPHY (a fictional drug)
 24 Hour Party People (2002) – MDMA, cocaine, heroin, methadone, cannabis, and a mention of the large amount of crack in Barbados
 25th Hour (2002) – heroin, MDMA
 28 Days (2000) – prescription drugs, heroin, alcohol
 28 Days Later (2002) – prescription drugs (Valium)
 30 Minutes or Less (2011) – cannabis
 The 40-Year-Old Virgin (2005) – cannabis
 50/50 (2011) – cannabis
 The 51st State (2001) – POS 51 (a fictional drug); mentions cocaine, LSD and MDMA
 54 (1998) – cannabis, cocaine, MDMA, Quaaludes
 9 (2009) – Magnet (a fictional drug), used by 8 which causes a drug-like effect
 99 Francs (2007) – cannabis, cocaine

A 
 A Street Cat Named Bob (2016) – Heroin, Methadone, Cannabis
 The Acid House (1998) – LSD, cannabis, poppers
 Across The Universe (2007) – LSD, cannabis, some kind of opiate (presumably morphine) 
 Acts of Worship (2001) – heroin, crack cocaine
 Adam & Paul (2003) – heroin, cannabis
 Adaptation. (2002) – fictional version of ghost orchid powder
 Adulthood (2008) – cannabis, cocaine
 Adventureland (2009) – cannabis
 Air America (1990) – heroin, opium
 Airplane! (1980) – cocaine, glue, amphetamine
 Alice in Acidland (1969) – LSD
 Alice (1988) – Amanita muscaria
 Almost Famous (2000) – cannabis, Vicodin, LSD and Quaaludes
 Alpha Dog (2007) – cannabis
 Altered States (1980) – cannabis, Amanita muscaria, LSD, DMT, and psilocybin
 American Beauty (1999) – cannabis
 American Cowslip (2009) – heroin
 American Gangster (2007) – heroin and cocaine
 American Made (2017) – cocaine
 American Psycho (2000) – cocaine, Halcion, Xanax, ecstasy and cannabis
 American Ultra (2015) – cannabis
 American Virgin (2009) – cannabis, unspecified drugs
 Amores Perros (2001) – cocaine
 Analyze That (2002) – cocaine
 Animal Kingdom (2010) – cannabis, cocaine, heroin
 The Anniversary Party (2001) – MDMA
 Annie Hall (1977) – cocaine
 Another Day in Paradise (1997) – heroin, references to morphine, biphetamine, methamphetamine and cocaine
 Another Happy Day (2011) – fentanyl
 Apocalypse Now (1979) – cannabis, LSD, and opium
 Around the Fire (1999) – cannabis, LSD
 Arrebato (1979) – heroin, cocaine and amyl nitrite
 Assassin of Youth (1937) – cannabis
 At Close Range (1986) – cannabis, pills, amphetamines
 Atlantic City (1980) – cocaine
 Attack the Block (2011) – cannabis, crack/cocaine
 Attack of the Meth Gator (2023) - methamphetamine
 Avenging Disco Godfather (1979) – PCP
 Awakening of the Beast (1970, aka O Ritual dos Sádicos and O Despertar da Besta) – LSD
 Awaydays (2009) – cocaine, cannabis and heroin

B 
 Babel (2006) – MDMA and opium
 Bad Batch (2010) – cannabis, cocaine
 Bad Boys (1995) – heroin
 Bad Boys II (2003) – MDMA and heroin
 Bad Lieutenant (1992) – crack, cocaine, heroin and cannabis
 Bad Moms (2016) – cannabis
 Bad Santa 2 (2016) - Rohypnol  
 Bad Teacher (2011) – cannabis, ecstasy, GHB
 The Ballad of Little Jo (1993) – opium
 Bang Boom Bang (1999) – cannabis
 Bangkok Hilton (1989) – heroin
 Basic Instinct (1992) – cocaine
 The Basketball Diaries (1995) – heroin, cocaine, cannabis, solvents and various pills 
 Batman Begins (2005) – a fictional hallucinogenic gas
 Be.Angeled (2001) – cocaine, MDMA, cannabis
 The Beach (2000) – cannabis, psychedelic mushrooms, stimulants
 The Beach Girls (1982) – cannabis, unidentified pills
Beautiful Boy (2018) – cannabis, crystal meth
 Beavis and Butt-head Do America (1996) – peyote 
 Beerfest (2006) – cannabis
 Before the Devil Knows You're Dead (2007) – heroin, cocaine
 Before I Disappear (2014) – heroin, pills
 Belly (1998) – heroin, cannabis
 Berkeley in the Sixties (1990)
 Berlin Calling (2008) – cocaine, MDMA, MDA, PMA, ketamine, cannabis; mentions LSD and methamphetamine
 Better Living Through Chemistry (2014) – pharmaceutical mixing and abuse
 La Beuze (2003) – chemical cannabis made by Nazis during WWII which gives users hallucinations of football players
 Beyond the Valley of the Dolls (1970) – cannabis, LSD, prescription pills, MDMA, peyote
 The Big Bang (2010) – Valium, methampthetamine
 The Big Boss (1971) – heroin
 The Big Chill (1983) – cannabis, cocaine
 The Big Easy (1987) – heroin
 The Big Lebowski (1998) – cannabis, LSD
 Bigger Than Life (1956) – cortisone (steroid hormone)
 Bird (1988) – heroin
 Black's Game (2012) – speed, MDMA, cocaine
 Black Cat, White Cat (1998) – cocaine
 Black Fear  (1915) – cocaine
 Black Snake Moan (2006) – prescription pills, ecstasy
 Black Swan (2010) – ecstasy
 Black Tar Heroin (1999) – black tar heroin, crack cocaine, methamphetamine, alcohol
 Blazing Saddles (1974) – cannabis
 The Bling Ring (2013) – cannabis, cocaine, heroin (smoked)
 Blood In Blood Out (1993) – cocaine, heroin
 Blow (2001) – cocaine, cannabis
 Bluehill Avenue (2001)-cannabis,heroin 
 Blue Sunshine (1976) – LSD
 Blue Velvet (1986) – nitrous oxide
 Blueberry (2004) – ayahuasca, peyote
 Bobby (2006) – LSD
 Bodies, Rest & Motion (1993) – cannabis
 Boiler Room (2000) – cocaine
 Bonded by Blood (2010) – cocaine, ecstasy
 Bongwater (1997) – cannabis, LSD, and cocaine
 Boogie Nights (1997) – cannabis, cocaine, methamphetamine
 Boondock Saints (1999) – cocaine
 The Boost (1988) – cocaine
 Borderland (2007) – cannabis, psychedelic mushrooms
 Borderline (1950) – drugs not identified
 The Boys & Girls Guide to Getting Down (2006) – cannabis, MDMA, cocaine, crack, heroin, amphetamine, Viagra
 The Boys in the Band (1970) – cannibas
 Boys Don't Cry (1999) – cannabis
 The Boys in Company C (1978) – Demerol and heroin
Boyhood (2014) – cannabis
 Kids in the Hall: Brain Candy (1996) – fictional drug GLeeMONEX
 The Breakfast Club (1985) – cannabis
 Brick (2006) – heroin
 Bride of Chucky (1998) - cannabis
 Bright Lights, Big City (1988) – cocaine
 Britannia Hospital (1982) – psilocybin mushrooms
 Brokedown Palace (1999) – heroin
 Broken (2007) – heroin
 Broken Vessels (1999) – heroin, methamphetamine
 A Bucket of Blood (1959) – heroin
 Buffalo Soldiers (2001) – heroin, MDMA
 Bug (2006) – methamphetamine, cannabis
 A Bug and a Bag of Weed (2006) – cannabis, hashish
 Bullet (1996) – heroin
 Bully (2001) – cannabis, LSD, methamphetamine
 The Business (2005) – cannabis, MDMA, cocaine

 C 
 Caddyshack (1980) – cannabis
 Candy (2006) – heroin, cannabis
 Candy Stripe Nurses (1974) – cannabis, amphetamines
 Carlito's Way: Rise to Power (2005) – heroin
 Cartoon All-Stars to the Rescue (1990 TV special) – cannabis, crack
 Cash Crop (2003) – cannabis
 Casino (1995) – cocaine, heroin, painkillers
 Cass (2008) – cannabis
 Caveman (1981) – fictional hallucinogenic berries
 Cecil B. Demented (2000) – heroin
 Chappaqua (1966) – peyote, heroin
 Charlie Bartlett (2008) – prescription pills (klonopin, prozac, ritalin, wellbutrin, xanax and zoloft)
 Cheech & Chong's various films feature drugs such as cannabis, cocaine, LSD, peyote, various pills and Ajax (comedy). They include:
 Up in Smoke (1978)
 Cheech & Chong's Next Movie (1980) – cannabis
 Nice Dreams (1981) – cannabis
 Things Are Tough All Over (1982) – cannabis
 Still Smokin' (1983) – cannabis
  Cherry Falls (2000) – cannabis
 Cherry, Harry & Raquel! (1970) – cannabis
 Cherrybomb (2009) – cannabis, cocaine, ecstasy
 Children of men (2006) – cannabis
  Chinatown Connection (1989) – cocaine
 Chinatown Nights (1929) – opium
 Chinese Opium Den (1894) – opium
 Chopper (2000) – cocaine, heroin, amphetamines
 Christiane F. – Wir Kinder vom Bahnhof Zoo (1981) – cannabis, LSD, heroin, various pills such as Valium and Mandrax
 The City Addicted to Crystal Meth (2009) – crystal meth (methamphetamine)
 City by the Sea (2002) – crack
 City Of God (2002) – cannabis, cocaine
 Clean and Sober (1988) – cocaine
 Clerks (1994) – cannabis
Climax (2018) – LSD, cannabis, cocaine
 Clockers (1995) – crack cocaine
 A Clockwork Orange (1971) – several fictional drugs in the form of a milk cocktail called Moloko Plus; varieties include Moloko Vellocet, either an opiate (percocet) or an amphetamine (velocity, speed), Synthemesc (synthetic mescaline), and Drencrom (adrenochrome)
 Club Paradise (1986) – cannabis
 Clubbed to Death (1996) – MDMA
 Clueless (1995) – cannabis, cocaine
 Cocaine Bear (2023) - cocaine
 Cocaine Cowboys (2006) - cocaine, cannabis
 Cocaine Cowboys 2 (2008) – cocaine
 Cocaine Fiends (1935) = Cocaine
 Cocaine: One Man's Seduction (1983) – cocaine
 Cocksucker Blues – cocaine and heroin
 Code of Silence (1985) – cocaine
 Colegas – cocaine and hashish 
 Colors (1988) – cannabis, crack cocaine, PCP
 Conspiracy Theory (1997) – LSD
 Contact High (2009) – cocaine, cannabis, MDMA, LSD, amphetamine
 Contraband (2012) – cocaine
 Contracted (2013) – Rohypnol, heroin
 Coogan's Bluff (1968) – cannabis, LSD
 Cookers (2001) – methamphetamine
 The Cool and the Crazy (1958) – cannabis
 Coonskin (1975) – LSD, heroin
 Cop Out (2010) – crack/cocaine, mescaline (referred to)
 Corridors of Blood (1958) – opium-based anaesthetic
 Country Man (1982) – cannabis
 Crank (2006) – fictional drug "Beijing Cocktail", cocaine, epinephrine, "Hardcore Haitian Plant Shit" (which probably refers to khat), methamphetamine, ephedrine, cannabis, and vicodin
 Crooklyn (1994) – glue (toluene)
 Crossing the Bridge (1992) – heroin
 The Crow (1994) – morphine
 Cruel Intentions (1999) – cocaine (memorably taken out of a rosary necklace)
 Crystal Fairy & the Magical Cactus (2012) – mescaline
 The Connection (1961) – heroin

 D 
 Dallas Buyers Club (2013) – cocaine, alcohol, methamphetamine, zidovudine, zalcitabine, peptide T
 Danger Diabolik (1968) – cannabis
 Darwin's Nightmare (2004) – glue (Toluene)
 The Day of the Beast (1995) – LSD
 Daymaker (2007) – cocaine, MDMA, LSD, cannabis
 Days of Wine and Roses (film) (1962) – alcohol
 Dazed and Confused (1993) – alcohol, cannabis, LSD
 Dead Presidents (1995) – Heroin, morphine
 Dead Man (1995) – peyote
 Dead Man's Shoes (2004) – cocaine, cannabis, LSD, MDMA
 Dead Ringers (1988) – various prescription drugs (dextroamphetamine and opioids)
 Deadly Addiction (1988) – cocaine
 Death at a Funeral (2010) – mescaline, Valium, ketamine (mentioned), acid (the pills in the Valium bottle)
 The Death of Richie (1977) – barbiturates, others
 Death Wish 2 (1982) – cannabis, PCP
 Death Wish 4: The Crackdown (1987) – crack cocaine
 The Decline of Western Civilization Part II: The Metal Years Deep Cover (1992) – crack cocaine
 Delta Force 2: The Colombian Connection (1990) – cocaine
 Den Siste Revejakta (2008) – hashish, cannabis, heroin, LSD
 The Departed (2006) – Oxycontin, lorazepam, heroin, cocaine
 Deprisa, Deprisa (1981) – Heroin
 Detroit Rock City (1999) – cannabis, psychedelic mushrooms
 Dev.D (2009) – cocaine, LSD, ecstasy, various pills
 Devil's Harvest (1942) – cannabis
 The Devil's Rejects (2005) – cocaine, cannabis
 Dick (1999) – cannabis, Quaaludes
 Dirty Grandpa (2016) – crack cocaine, xanax, cannabis
 District 13 (2004) – cocaine, cannabis
 Domino (2005) – mescaline, cannabis, cocaine
 Donkey Punch (2008) – ketamine, Methamphetamine, MDMA, cannabis
 Don's Plum (2001) – heroin, cannabis
 Don't Be a Menace to South Central While Drinking Your Juice in the Hood (1996) – cannabis, crack cocaine
 Don't Tell Mom the Babysitter's Dead (1991) – cannabis
 The Doors (1991) – LSD, cocaine, heroin, cannabis, peyote
 Dope Sick Love (2005) – heroin, crack cocaine
 Down in the Valley (2005) – MDMA
 Dragon Eyes (2012) – crack, heroin
 Dream with the Fishes (1997) – heroin, LSD
 Dreamseller (2007) – heroin
 Dredd (2012) – fictional drug Slo-mo (slows the user's perception to 1%)
 The Drug Traffic  (1923)
 Drugstore Cowboy (1989) – cocaine, hydromorphone, oxymorphone, morphine, amphetamines, valium (diazepam), methamphetamine, heroin
 Dude, Where's My Car? (2000) – cannabis
 Due Date (2010) – cannabis and vicodin
 The Dukes of Hazzard (2005) – cannabis

 E 
 Easy A (2010) – cannabis
 Easy Rider (1969) – cannabis, cocaine and LSD
 Easy Money (1983) – marijuana
 Easy Street (1917) – cocaine
 Ecstasy (2011) – Little Red Pill
 ed! (1996) – cannabis, MDMA
 Ed Wood (1994) – morphine
 Eden Lake (2009) – amyl nitrate
 El Camino: A Breaking Bad Movie (2019) - cocaine, Methylamine mentioned 
 Elephant White (2011) – heroin
 Embrace of the Serpent (2015) – nyakwána, Ayahuasca (caapi), yakruna (fictional)
 Emerald Forest (1985) – Virola snuff
 Empire (2002) – heroin, cannabis
 Empire Records (1995) – amphetamines
 Enter the Dragon (1973) – heroin
 Enter the Void (2009) – cocaine, LSD, GHB, cannabis, MDMA, methamphetamine, Datura, DMT
 Equilibrium (2002) – fictional drug Prozium
 Essex Boys (2000) – MDMA, heroin
 Eternal Sunshine of the Spotless Mind (2004) – cannabis
 Euro Trip (2004) – cannabis/hashish, absinthe, amphetamines, benzedrine
 Even Cowgirls Get the Blues (1993) – peyote
 Everywhere and Nowhere (2011) – cannabis, cocaine, MDMA
 Evil Bong (2006) – cannabis
 Evil Bong 2: King Bong (2009) – cannabis
 The Expendables (2010) – cocaine
 The Exorcist (1973) – ritalin and thorazine
 Extract (2009) – ketamine, Xanax, various other drugs
 Eyes Wide Shut (1999) – cannabis, speedballs

 F 
 Factory Girl (2006) – cannabis, speed, heroin, prescription pills
 The Falcon and the Snowman (1985) – cocaine
 Fame chimica (2003) – cannabis and cocaine
 Fanboys (2009) – peyote
 Fandango (2000) – cannabis, cocaine
 Fast Times at Ridgemont High (1982) – cannabis
 Faster (2010) – heroin
 Fear and Loathing in Las Vegas (1998) – cannabis, mescaline, thorazine, LSD, cocaine, amphetamines, barbiturates, ether, amyl nitrite, opium, hashish, hash oil, heroin, adrenochrome
 Federal Fugitives (1941) – pills
 Fifty Pills (2006) – MDMA
 The Final Programme (1973)
 Flashback (1990) – LSD
 Flirting with Disaster (1996) – LSD
 Foo-Foo Dust (2003) – crack cocaine and heroin
 The Football Factory (2004) – cannabis, inhalants, amphetamines, crack/cocaine
 A Force of One (1979) – cocaine and heroin
 Formula 51 (2002) – fictional drug like ecstasy
 Forrest Gump (1994) – cocaine, heroin, cannabis, LSD, unidentified pills
 Freak Talks About Sex (1999) – cannabis
 Freebird (2008) – marijuana, psychedelic mushrooms
 Freddy's Dead: The Final Nightmare (1991) – cannabis
 The French Connection (1971) – heroin, cocaine
 French Connection II (1975) – heroin
 Fresh (1994) – cocaine, crack cocaine, heroin
 Friday (1995) – cannabis, PCP
 Friday After Next (2002) – cannabis
 Friday the 13th film series (1980–2009) – cannabis is smoked in most of the films
 Friday the 13th Part VIII: Jason Takes Manhattan (1989) – cocaine, heroin
 Friend of the World (2020) – a fictional hallucinogenic antidote
 Fringe series – LSD, unidentified psychoactive drugs
 Fritz the Cat (1972) – cannabis, heroin
 From Hell (2001) – opium, laudanum, absinthe
 From Paris with Love (2010) – cocaine, possibly heroin
The Five Heartbeats

 G 
 Gambling, Gods and LSD (2002) – crack, cocaine, LSD
 Gangster Exchange (2011) – cannabis, MDMA, LSD, crack, heroin
 Garden State (2004) – cocaine, MDMA, marijuana, nitrous oxide
 Georgia (1995) – heroin
 Get Him to the Greek (2010) – cannabis, absinthe, heroin, "Jeffrey", cocaine, adrenaline
 Get Out and Get Under (1920) – cocaine
 Get Rich or Die Tryin' (2005) – crack, cannabis, morphine
 Ghost in the Shell (2017) – cannabis
 Gia (1998) – heroin, cocaine
 Gift (1993)The Girl Who Knew Too Much (1963) – cannabis Girl, Interrupted (1999) – cannabis, diazepam, Vallium
 The Girl Next Door (2004) – MDMA, cannabis
 Go (1999) – MDMA, cannabis, cocaine
 Go Ask Alice (1973) – LSD, cannabis, amphetamines
 The Godfather (1972) – cocaine, heroin
 The Godfather Part II (1974) – cocaine, heroin
 The Godfather Part III (1990) – cocaine, heroin
 Good Boys (2019) - ecstasy 
 The Good Shepherd (2006) – LSD
Good Time (2017) – LSD, Oxycontin, Xanax, cannabis
 Goodfellas (1990) – cocaine, pills
 Goon (2011) – cannabis
 Gorp (1980) – amphetamines, Quaaludes
 Grandma's Boy (2006) – cannabis
 Grass (1999) – cannabis
 The Greatest (2009)
 The Green Butchers (2003) – cannabis
 The Green Hornet (2011) – methamphetamine
 Gretel & Hansel (2020) – Amanita muscaria Gridlock'd (1997) – heroin
 Grimsby (2016) – cocaine, heroin
 Grindhouse (2007) – cannabis
 Groove (2000) – GHB, MDMA, nitrous, LSD, cannabis
 The Groove Tube (1974) – cannabis
 The Guard (2011) – LSD, cocaine
 The Guest (2014) – marijuana
 Gummo (1997) – glue, Ritalin, solvents, cocaine

 H 
 La Haine (1995) – cannabis, hashish, cocaine
 Hair (1979) – cannabis, LSD
 Half Baked (1998) – cannabis
 Half Nelson (2006) – cocaine, crack cocaine
 Hall Pass (2011) – cannabis
 Halloween (1978) – cannabis
 The Hangover (2009) – GHB, rohypnol
  The Hangover 2 (2011) – cocaine
  The Hangover 3 (2013) – demerol, rohypnol, ecstasy
 Hannibal (2001) – chloroform, morphine, unknown sedatives
 Happy Death Day (2017) – unknown lethal drugs, aggression-inducing drugs
 Hard Ticket to Hawaii (1987) – cannabis
 Hardbodies (1984) – marijuana and cocaine
 Hare Rama Hare Krishna (1971) – cannabis
 Harold & Kumar Escape from Guantanamo Bay (2008) – cannabis, psilocybin mushrooms
 Harold & Kumar Go to White Castle (2004) – cannabis, MDMA, cocaine
 Harold & Kumar: A Very Harold & Kumar 3D Christmas (2011) – cannabis, psilocybin extract, crack, ecstasy, cocaine
 Harry Brown (2009) – cannabis, crack cocaine, heroin
 Harsh Times (2006) – cannabis
 Harvard Man (2001) – cannabis, LSD
 The Hasher's Delirium, aka Le songe d'un garçon de café (1910) – absinthe
 A Hatful of Rain (1957) – morphine
 Havoc (2005) – cocaine, crack
 Head (1968) – cannabis, LSD
 Head, Heart and Balls... or Why I Gave Up Smoking Pot (2007) – cannabis
 Heavy Metal (1981) – fictional drug "Nyborg" (parody of cocaine)
 The Heart Is Deceitful Above All Things (2004) – methamphetamine
 Hells Angels on Wheels (1967) – cannabis, amphetamines
 High Art (1998) – heroin
 High School Confidential (1958) – cannabis, heroin
 High School High (1996) – cannabis
 Hobo With A Shotgun (2011) – cocaine
 Hollywood High (2003)
 Holy Rollers (2010) – MDMA
 El hombre de los hongos, aka The Mushroom Man (1976) – psychedelic mushrooms
 A Home at the End of the World (2004) – cannabis, LSD
 Homegrown (1998) – cannabis
 Honky (1971) - marijuana
 La Horde (2010) – cocaine
 Horrible Bosses (2011) – cocaine, nitrous oxide
 Horrible Bosses 2 (2014) – nitrous oxide (laughing gas)
 Hot Rod (2007) – LSD
 Hot Tub Time Machine (2010) – cannabis, psilocybin mushrooms, cocaine
 How High (2001) – cannabis
 Howard Marks. Mr Nice (2010) – cannabis, LSD, opium
 Human Traffic (1999) – cannabis, cocaine, MDMA
 Human Wreckage (1923)
 Humboldt County (2008) – cannabis
 Hunt to Kill (2010) – methamphetamine
 Hurlyburly (1998) – cannabis, cocaine, diazepam
 Hustle & Flow (2005) – cannabis
 homeless to harvard-heroin

 I 
 ICE- Hawaii's Crystal Meth Epidemic (2005) - History of methamphetamine from WWII to the shores of Waikiki
 I Come in Peace (1990) – heroin and Barsi (fictional drug manufactured by extraterrestrial technology)
 I Got The Hook Up (1998) – cannabis, cocaine and LSD
 I Love You, Alice B. Toklas (1968) – cannabis brownies
 I Love You Phillip Morris (2010) – heroin
 Idle Hands (1999) – cannabis
 If Drugs Were Legal (2009) – cannabis, cocaine, crack, ketamine, heroin, MDMA, LSD, amphetamines (and fictional drugs, including "dexclorazole," which mimics the effects of fluoxetine but on a much larger scale; and "xp25," which stimulates the serotonin neurotransmitters in the brain but causes sudden heart attack)
 Igby Goes Down (2002) – heroin, cannabis
 Ill manors (2012) – crack, cannabis
 Illtown (1998)
 I'm Dancing as Fast as I Can (1982) – Diazepam
 In Bruges (2008) – cocaine, ketamine, LSD, ecstasy
 In Vanda's Room (2000) – heroin
 Inauguration of the Pleasure Dome (1954) – ayahuasca
 Ingrid Goes West (2017) – cannabis, cocaine
 Inherent Vice (2014) – cannabis, heroin
 Inner Trial (2008) – LSD, cannabis, psychedelic mushrooms
 An Innocent Man (1989) – cocaine
 Into the Blue (2005) – cocaine
 Iowa (2005) – manufacture and use of methamphetamine
 Irréversible (2002) – cocaine
 Irvine Welsh's Ecstasy (2011) – ecstasy, cannabis and cocaine
 It's All Gone Pete Tong (2004) – cocaine, yopo snuff, and toad licking, presumably a reference to the Bufo Alvarius or Colorado River toad from which the extract should not actually be licked as in the film, but smoked, due to bufo toxin which is incinerated upon smoking; can contain 5-meo-dmt and/or bufotenin

 J 
 Jackie Brown (1997) – cocaine, cannabis
 Jacob's Ladder (1990) – Quinuclidinyl benzilate (BZ)
 Janky Promoters (2009) – cannabis
 Jay and Silent Bob Strike Back (2001) – cannabis
 Jesus' Son (1999) – heroin, cannabis, cocaine, LSD, opium, psychedelic mushrooms, tobacco, amphetamines, and diazepam
 Jewel Robbery (1932) – cannabis
 Johnny Stecchino (1991) – cocaine
 Jubilee (1977) – Quaaludes
 Jungle (2017) – psilocybin mushrooms
 Jungle Fever (1991) – crack cocaine

 K 
 K-PAX (2001) – thorazine and haldol
 Ken Park (2002) – marijuana
 The Kentucky Fried Movie (1977) – heroin and opium
 Kid Cannabis (2014) – cannabis, cocaine, oxycodone
 Kids (1995) – marijuana, nitrous oxide, MDMA, cocaine and possibly GHB (not ketamine)
 Kidulthood (2006) – cannabis, cocaine, unknown pills
 Kill Bill: Vol. 2 (2004) – cocaine
 Kill Your Darlings (2013) – marijuana, nitrous oxide, benzedrine and methamphetamine
 Killer Bud (2001) – marijuana
 Killing Zoe (1994) – heroin
 King of New York (1990) – cocaine
 Kinjite: Forbidden Subjects (1989) – marijuana, cocaine and heroin
 Kiss of the Dragon (2001) – heroin
 Knocked Up (2007) – marijuana and psychedelic mushrooms
 Kush (2007) – marijuana, cocaine

 L 

  [ Labyrinth] (film) All drugs
 L.A. Confidential (1997) – marijuana and heroin
 Lady Sings The Blues (1972) – heroin
 Lammbock (2001) – 
marijuana, hashish, psychedelic mushrooms and cocaine
 The Last American Virgin (1982) – marijuana and cocaine
 The Last Days of Disco (1998)
 Last Life in the Universe (2003) – marijuana
 The Last Minute (2001) – heroin
 Layer Cake (2004) – cocaine, crack cocaine and MDMA
 Leaves of Grass (2009) – marijuana
 Leaving Las Vegas (1995) – alcohol
 Lenny (1974) – heroin
 Léon: The Professional (1994) – cocaine
 Leprechaun in the Hood (2000) - marijuana
 Leprechaun: Back 2 tha Hood (2003) – marijuana
 Less than Zero (1987) – cocaine
 Lethal Weapon (1987) – cocaine and heroin
 Lethal Weapon 4 (1998) – nitrous oxide (laughing gas)
 Licence to Kill (1989) – cocaine
 The Life Aquatic with Steve Zissou (2004) – marijuana
 Life or Meth - Hawaii's Youth (2006) Follow up to documentary film simulcast in state of Hawaii, authentic, real teenagers
 Life Is Hot in Cracktown (2009) – crack cocaine
 Light Sleeper (1992) – cocaine
 Lights in the Dusk (2006) – alcohol
 Limitless (2011) – fictional drug "NZT48"
 Liquid Sky (1982) – heroin
 Little Fish (2005) – heroin
 Little Miss Sunshine – heroin, Viagra and anorectics are referred to
 Little Shop of Horrors (1986) – nitrous oxide (laughing gas)
 Live and Let Die (1973) – heroin
 Live Nude Girls (1995) – marijuana
 Lock, Stock and Two Smoking Barrels (1998) – marijuana and cocaine
 Loft (2008) – cocaine
 London (2005) – cocaine and marijuana
 London Boulevard (2010) – cannabis, cocaine, opium
 Looking for Eric (2009) – marijuana
 Lord of War (2005) – cocaine and brown-brown
 Lords of Dogtown (2005) – marijuana
 The Loser Takes It All (2002) – alcohol
 Lost in Translation (2003) – marijuana, possibly other psychedelics
 The Lost Weekend (1945) – alcohol
 Love (2015) – alcohol, ayahuasca, marijuana
 Love. Blood. Kryptonite. (2008) – marijuana, cocaine
 Love Is The Drug (2006) – cocaine, prescription pills
 Love Liza (2002) – gasoline fumes
 Low Down (2014) – heroin
 LSD, Trip or Trap (1967) – LSD
 Lucy (2014) – fictional nootropic CPH4

M 
 Macarthur Park (2001) – crack cocaine
 Machete (2010) – cannabis, methamphetamine
 Mafia! (1998) – cocaine
 Magic Trip (2011) – LSD, AMT, psychedelics
 Magnolia (1999) – cocaine, amphetamines (Dexedrine), morphine
 Magnum Force (1973) – heroin
 Malibu Beach (1978) – marijuana
 Malibu High (1979) – marijuana, cocaine
 Mallrats (1995) – cannabis
 Mandy (2018) - LSD, cocaine
 The Martian (2015) – vicodin
 Midnight Delight (2016) – cannabis
 The Man with the Golden Arm (1955) – heroin
 Mantis in Lace (1968) – LSD
 Marfa Girl (2012) – cannabis
 Maria Full of Grace (2004) – heroin
 Marihuana (1936) – cannabis
 Maryjane (1968) – cannabis and hashish
 Mask (1985) – unidentified drugs
 Max Payne (2008) – fictional drug Valkyrie
 McCabe & Mrs. Miller (1971) – opium
 McQ (1974) – heroin and cocaine
 MDMA (2010) – MDMA
 Mean Streets (1973) – heroin
 The Men Who Stare At Goats (2009) – steroids, LSD, cannabis, amphetamine
 Menace II Society (1993) – crack cocaine, heroin and cannabis
 Miami Vice (2006) – cocaine
 Middle Men (2009) – cocaine, barbiturates
 Midnight Cowboy (1969) – marijuana, unspecified hallucinogenic pills
 Midnight Express (1978) – hashish, codeine, LSD and cannabis, references to heroin
 Midsommar (2019) – psilocybin mushrooms
 A Midsummer Night's Rave (2002) – MDMA, cocaine
 Mike and Dave Need Wedding Dates (2016) – cannabis, MDMA
 Minority Report (2002) – fictional psychoactive drug "Clarity"
 Missing Link (1988) – unidentified plant
 Modern Times (1936) – cocaine
 Mondo Mod (1967) – cannabis
 Moneyz (2009) – cannabis, cocaine, heroin, methamphetamine, LSD
 Monkey on My Back (1957) – morphine
 Monos (2019) – psilocybin
 More (1969) – cannabis, heroin, absinthe, Dexamyl (amphetamine-barbiturate), LSD, and a homemade concoction made from cannabis (resin), benzedrine, "red ibogaine", nutmeg and banana peel
 Morfiy (2008) – morphine
 Morning Patrol (1987) – alcohol
 La morte accarezza a mezzanotte (1972) – LSD
 Most High (2006) – cocaine and methamphetamine
 Mouth to Mouth (2005) – cannabis, many other drugs
 Mr. Nice (2010) – marijuana, hashish
 Munje! (2001) – cannabis
 My Name Ain't Johnny (2008) cannabis, mainly cocaine
 My Own Private Idaho (1991) – cocaine
 Mysterious Skin (2004) – cocaine
 The Mystery of the Leaping Fish (1916) – cocaine, opium

N 
 The Naked Gun (1988) – heroin
 Naked Lunch (1991) – heroin, cannabis, opiates, fictional hallucinogenic bug powder
 A Name for Evil (1973) – LSD
 Narc (2002) – heroin, cannabis and possibly cocaine
 National Lampoon's Animal House (1978) – cannabis
 National Lampoon's Totally Baked: A Potumentary (2006) – cannabis
 National Lampoon's Vacation (1983) – marijuana
 Natural Born Killers (1994) – magic mushrooms, other drugs suggested but not explicitly stated
 Navajeros (1980) – LSD and Hashish
 Neighbors (2014) – cannabis, magic mushrooms
 Neighbors 2: Sorority Rising (2016) – cannabis, GHB
 Never Die Alone (2004) – cocaine, heroin
 New Jack City (1991) – crack cocaine
 Next Day Air (2009) – cocaine, cannabis
 Next Friday (2000) – cannabis
 The Night Before (2015) – psychedelic mushrooms, cannabis, MDMA, cocaine
 A Nightmare on Drug Street (1989) – cocaine, unidentified pills
 A Nightmare on Elm Street 3: Dream Warriors (1987) – heroin
 Nil by Mouth (1997) – heroin
 The Nine Lives of Fritz the Cat (1974) – cannabis, hallucinogenic drugs
 Nine to Five (1980) – cannabis
 Nixon (1995) – prescription drugs
 Nobody (2021) - cocaine
 No Country for Old Men (2007) – heroin
 Nordkraft (2005) – cannabis, cocaine, methadone, heroin
 North Dallas Forty (1979) – marijuana, cocaine and painkillers
 The Northman (2022) – Amanita muscaria
 Notorious (2009) – cocaine, crack and cannabis
 Nowhere (1997) – cannabis and MDMA

O 
 O (2001) – steroids, cocaine
 On the Road (2012) – cannabis, benzedrine, morphine and alcohol
 Once Upon a Time in America (1984) – opium
 Once Upon a Time in Hollywood (2019) – alcohol, cannabis, LSD
 One False Move (1992) – cocaine
 One Perfect Day (2004) – cannabis, painkillers, amphetamines and MDMA
 Ong-Bak (2008) – opium
 The Opium Eater (2011) – opium
 Orange County (2002) – amphetamines, painkillers, cannabis, MDMA
 The Other Guys (2010) – cannabis mentioned
 Over The Edge (1979) – cannabis and LSD
 Out of the Blue (1980)
 Outland (1981) – amphetamine-type drug
 Outside Providence (1999) – cannabis and Quaaludes (referred to as "vitamin Q")
 Oxy-morons (2010) – oxycotin, heroin, Vicidon

P 
 The Pace That Kills (aka Cocaine Fiends) (1935) – cocaine
 Paid in Full (2002) – cocaine, crack and cannabis
 Pain & Gain (2013) – cocaine, ecstasy, Xylazine
 The Palermo Connection (1991) – all drugs are referred to
 The Panic in Needle Park (1971) – heroin
 Pandemic in a Pandemic (2021) - Post Covid rise in mental health issues and substance abuse
 Papillon (1973) – cocaine (coca leaves)
 Parked (2010) – heroin and cannabis
 Party Monster (2003) – crack/cocaine, heroin, MDMA, LSD, ketamine
 Pathology (2008) – methamphetamine, nitrous oxide (laughing gas)
 PCU (1994) – cannabis 
 Perfect High (2015) – hydrocodone, codeine, Oxycontin, heroin; Adderall and benzodiazepines are referred to
 Performance (1970) – psychedelic mushrooms
 Permanent Midnight (1998) – heroin and cocaine
 Photographing Fairies (1997) – fictional psychoactive flowers
 Pimp (2010) – cannabis, crack/cocaine, heroin is referred to
 Pineapple Express (2008) – cannabis, Oxycodone is referred to
 Piñero (2001) – heroin, cannabis, cocaine
 Pink Cadillac (1989) – methamphetamine
 Pink Flamingos (1972) – poppers; the Marbles are involved in a heroin ring in inner-city schools
 Pink Floyd The Wall (1982) – hashish; this film is often considered a drug-induced movie (LSD, psychedelics)
 Pirates of Silicon Valley (1999) – cannabis, LSD
 The Place Beyond the Pines (2012) - cannabis, MDMA, oxycontin
 Platoon (1986) – cannabis, and opium
 Platoon Leader (1988) – heroin
 Playing God (1997) – fentanyl, morphine and amphetamines
 Poltergeist (1982) – cannabis
 Polvere (2009) – cocaine
 Portrait of a Lady on Fire (2019) – atropine, scopolamine (Flying ointment )
 Possession (1981) – psilocybin mushrooms
 Pot Zombies (2005) – cannabis
 Prayer of the Rollerboys (1990) – fictional drug "mist"
 The Principles of Lust (2003) – cannabis, cocaine, MDMA, ayahuasca (yage), pills
 The Private Lives of Pippa Lee (2009) – dexedrine, amphetamine
 Private Parts (1997) – marijuana
 Project X (2012) – ecstasy, cocaine, cannabis
 Protégé (2007) – heroin
 Prozac Nation (2001) – cannabis, cocaine, prozac (fluoxetine) and ecstasy 
 Psych-Out (1968) – LSD and DOM
 Puddle Cruiser (1996) – cannabis
 Puff, Puff, Pass (2006) – cannabis
 Pulp Fiction (1994) – cocaine, heroin, cannabis
 Punisher: War Zone (2008) – cocaine, methamphetamine
 Pure (2002) – heroin

Q 
 Quadrophenia (1979) – amphetamines (known as "Blues" in the film)
 Quiet Cool (1986) – marijuana

R 
 Rachel Getting Married (2008) – cannabis, Oxycodone (Percocet)
 Rambo: Last Blood (2019) - cocaine, Flunitrazepam, valium pills
 Rapture-Palooza (2013) – cannabis
 Rave - The Ultimate Party (2000) – MDMA
 Ray (2004) – heroin, cannabis
 Rebound: The Legend of Earl "The Goat" Manigault (1996) – heroin
 Red Angel, aka Akai tenshi (1966) – morphine
 Reefer Madness (1936) – cannabis
 Reefer Madness (2005 remake) – cannabis
 Reeker (2005) – MDMA
 Amants réguliers, Les (2005) – cannabis
 Reindeer Spotting – Escape from Santaland (2010) – Subutex, amphetamine, heroin and cannabis
 Remember the Daze (2007) – mushrooms, cannabis
 Reno 911!: Miami (2007) – cocaine
 Rent (2005) – heroin, cannabis
 Repo! The Genetic Opera (2008) – fictional drug "Zydrate," a powerful and highly-addictive painkiller and hallucinogenic, manufactured by GeneCo, for people undergoing surgery; "graverobbers" sell a cheap version of Zydrate on the black market extracted from the blood of the dead
 Repo Man (1984) – cannabis, cocaine and amphetamines
 Requiem for a Dream (2000) – heroin, cannabis, MDMA, cocaine, amphetamines, barbiturates
 Return to Paradise (1998) – cannabis resin
 Revenge of the Nerds (1984) – cannabis
 Riding the Bullet (2004) – cannabis
 Rich Kids (1979) – cocaine
 Righteous Kill (2009) – cocaine
 Riot on Sunset Strip (1967) – marijuana and LSD
 Rise of the Footsoldier (2007) – steroids, cannabis, cocaine, heroin, MDMA, ketamine
 Rise of the Planet of the Apes (2011) – fictional drug "ALZ-113"
 Risky Business (1983) – cannabis
 RoboCop (1987) – cocaine
 RoboCop 2 (1990) – fictional drug "Nuke"
 RocknRolla (2008) – cannabis, cocaine, heroin
 Rockers (1978) – cannabis
 Rolling (2007) – MDMA, cannabis
 Rolling Kansas (2003) – cannabis
 Romeo + Juliet (1996) – a substance that is similar to, or actually is MDMA, known as "Queen Mab"
 The Rose (1979) – heroin, barbiturates
 The Royal Tenenbaums (2001) – cannabis, cocaine, mescaline
 Rube in an Opium Joint (1904) – opium; considered the oldest still existing motion picture to contain substance abuse
 The Rules of Attraction (2002) – mushrooms, cocaine, LSD, methamphetamine, cannabis and MDMA
 The Rum Diary (2011) – LSD
 Run! Bitch Run! (2009) – cannabis, crack/cocaine
 The Runaways (2010) – cocaine, MDMA, Quaaludes
 Running with Scissors (2006) – prescription medications
 Rush (1991) – heroin, tobacco, amphetamines, cannabis, cocaine

S 
 The Salton Sea (2002) – methamphetamine
 Sample People (2000) – fictional drug "glow" and cocaine
 Sausage Party (2016) – cannabis, bath salts
 Savage Beach (1989) – heroin
 Savages (2012) – cannabis, cocaine
 Saving Grace (2000) – cannabis
 A Scanner Darkly (2006) – cocaine, cannabis, methamphetamine, and "Substance D," a fictional psychoactive stimulant
 Scarface (1983) – cocaine, heroin, Quaaludes
 Scary Movie (2000) - cannabis
 Scott Pilgrim Vs. The World (2010) – cannabis, mushrooms
 Scrooged (1988) – marijuana and heroin
 Secrets of Chinatown (1935) – opium
 The Serpent and the Rainbow (1988) – Haitian witch concoction containing scopolamine
 The Seven-Per-Cent Solution (1976) – cocaine
 Sex and the City (2008) – marijuana
 Sex & Drugs & Rock & Roll (2010) – cannabis, amphetamines, cocaine
 Sexy Bitches (2005) – cannabis
 The Sexy Killer (1976) – heroin
 Shank (2010) – khat, cannabis
 She Shoulda Said 'No'! (1949) – cannabis
 Sherrybaby (2004) – heroin
 Shot List (2009) – LSD, cocaine, cannabis
 Shrink (2009) – cannabis, amphetamine, cocaine
 Shrooms (2007) – magic mushrooms, cannabis
 Siberia (1998) – cannabis, MDMA, amyl nitrate
 Sid and Nancy (1986) – heroin, methadone, cannabis
 The Skeleton Twins (2014) – nitrous oxide, alcohol, cannabis
 Skidoo (1968) – LSD
 Slackers (2002) – cannabis
 SLC Punk! (1999) – LSD, oxycodone, Percocet, cannabis
 Sleepaway Camp II: Unhappy Campers (1988) – marijuana
 Slim Susie (2003) – amphetamine, heroin, cannabis
 Smiley Face (2007) – cannabis
 Smoked. The Movie (2012) – cannabis, cocaine
 Smokin' Aces (2007) – cocaine, ritalin
 The Social Network (2010) – cocaine, cannabis
 Something Weird (1967) – LSD
 Sorted (2000) – heroin, MDMA, methamphetamine, pills
Sorry to Bother You (2018) – Cannabis, cocaine
Soul Plane (2004) – mushrooms, cannabis
Southwest Nine (2004) – LSD, MDMA, cannabis
Spring Break (1983) – marijuana
Spring Breakers (2013) – marijuana, crack/cocaine
Spun (2002) – ephedrine, methamphetamine
Square Grouper: The Godfathers of Ganja (2011) – cannabis
Squeeze (1997)
Stark Raving Mad (2002) – cannabis, GHB, MDMA
Starsky & Hutch (2004) – cocaine
State Property (2002) – cannabis, crack/cocaine
Steal This Movie (2000) – cannabis
Steppenwolf (1974)
Steve-O: Demise And Rise – cannabis, LSD, PCP, cocaine, nitrous oxide, pills
Stoned (2005) – cannabis, hashish, LSD, DMT, psilocybin, cocaine, alcohol, amphetamines, barbiturates
The Stoned Age (1994) – cannabis
Stoned: In The Beginning (2010) – cannabis, LSD, cocaine, sleeping pills, crack
Strange Days (1995) – fictional drug "SQUID"
Strange Wilderness (2008) – cannabis, nitrous oxide
Streets of Blood (2009) – cocaine/crack
Stripes (1981) – LSD 
Stuck in Love" (2012)- cannabis, cocaine
The Student Nurses (1970) – LSD
The Substance: Albert Hofmann's LSD (2011) – LSD
Sugarhouse (2007) – cannabis, crack/cocaine
Summer of Sam (1999) – cocaine, cannabis
Sunset Strip (2000) – cannabis, cocaine, LSD, alcohol
Super Fly (1972) – cocaine, cannabis
Super High Me (2007) – cannabis
Super Troopers (2001) – cannabis, psychedelic mushrooms, LSD
Superbad (2007) – cocaine, cannabis
Surfer, Dude (2008) – cannabis
S.W.A.T.: Firefight (2011) – cannabis
Sweet Bird of Youth (1962) – amphetamine, cannabis (resin)
Sweet Nothing (1996) – crack cocaine
Synanon (1965) – heroin

T 
 Taking Off (1971) – cannabis
 Taking Woodstock (2009) – cannabis, LSD
 Taxi 3 (2003) – cannabis and cocaine
 Ted (2012) – cannabis, psychedelic mushrooms and cocaine implicated
 Ted 2 (2015) – cannabis and cocaine implicated
 Tenacious D in The Pick of Destiny (2006) – cannabis, psychedelic mushrooms
 Terminal Bliss (1992) – marijuana, cocaine, LSD and methamphetamine
 Terrifier 2 (2022) - cocaine, MDMA
 Thank You For Smoking (2006) – cigarettes, nicotine (patches)
 That Was Then... This Is Now (1985) – unknown "colorful" pills (assumed LSD)
 That's Your Funeral (1972) – cannabis
 The Thing (1982) – cannabis
 The Cannabis Diary (2022) – cannabis
 Things We Lost In The Fire (2007) - heroin
 Thirteen (2003) – inhalants ("Airduster"), LSD, cannabis, cocaine, various prescription drugs, MDMA (in the form of "Booty Juice")
 This Is England (2006) – cannabis
 This Is the End (2013) – cannabis, MDMA, Magic Mushrooms
 Thriller - A Cruel Picture (1973) – heroin
 Through a Blue Lens (1999) – crack cocaine, heroin
 Thumbsucker (2005) – cannabis, cocaine, and ritalin
 Thursday (1998) – cocaine, cannabis
 Tideland (2005) – heroin
 The Tingler (1959) – first film to feature LSD
 Toad Road (2012) – acid, various other drugs
 Tommy (1975) – heroin, LSD
 Tomorrow, When the War Began (2010) – cannabis
 The Town (2010) – oxycontin, cocaine
 Trading Places (1983) – marijuana
 Traffic (2000) – cannabis, cocaine, heroin, crack cocaine
 Trailer Park Jesus (2012) – LSD
 Training Day (2001) – cannabis, crack cocaine, and PCP
 Trainspotting (1996) – heroin, opium, MDMA, amphetamines, Valium, hashish, morphine, diamorphine, cyclizine, codeine, temazepam, nitrazepam, phenobarbitone, sodium amytal, dextropropoxyphene, methadone, nalbuphine, pethidine, pentazocine, buprenorphine, dextromoramide, chlormethiazole
 Transformers: Revenge of the Fallen (2009) – cannabis brownies
 Trapped in a Purple Haze (2000) – heroin
 Trash (1970) – heroin
 Trolls (2016) – satirical messages about psychedelic drugs including opium
 The Trip (1967) – LSD, cannabis 
 The Tripper (2007) – cocaine, nitrous oxide, cannabis, LSD, MDMA
 True Romance (1993) – cocaine, cannabis
 Tweek City (1995) – methamphetamine
 Twelve (2010) – cannabis, Twelve (fictional drug with similar effects to MDMA and cocaine), many drugs referred to
 Twin Peaks: Fire Walk With Me (1992) – cocaine
 Twin Town (1997) – cannabis, heroin, cocaine, magic mushrooms, glue
Twins (1988) - Cocaine use

The Temptations

U 
 Uncivilised (1937) – opium
 The Union: The Business Behind Getting High (2007) – cannabis
 The UnMiracle (2017) – cocaine, heroin, ritalin and vicodin
 Up in Smoke (1978) – cannabis, LSD, pills, amphetamines
 Unprescribed - Prescription for Addiction (2021) Opioids
 The Usual Suspects (1995) – cocaine
 Udta Punjab (2016) – cocaine, heroin, pheniramine, buprenorphine (chaanf in Punjab)

V 
 Valley of the Dolls (1967) – barbiturates (Seconal, Nembutal, Amytal), amphetamines (Dexedrine), and Demerol
 Vanishing Point (1971) – amphetamine (Benzedrine)
 Veronika Voss (1982) – opiates
 Very Bad Things (1998) – marijuana and cocaine
 A Very Brady Sequel (1996) – magic mushrooms

W 
 The Wackness (2008) – cannabis, cocaine, methylphenidate and anti-depressants
 Waiting... (2005) – cannabis and inhalants
 Wall Street (1987) – cocaine, mushrooms mentioned
 Walk Hard: The Dewey Cox Story (2007) – cannabis, cocaine, Quaaludes, PCP, amphetamine, pills ("uppers and downers"), LSD and Viagra
 Walk the Line (2005) – cocaine and amphetamine
 The Warriors – marijuana
 The Wash (2001) – cannabis
 We Need to Talk About Kevin (2011) – prozac (fluoxetine)
 Weekend at Bernie's (1989) – cocaine and heroin
 Weirdsville (2007) – heroin, cannabis
 We're the Millers (2013) – cannabis
 What Just Happened (2008) – hydromorphone, benzodiazepines, cocaine is referred to
 Where the Boys Are '84 (1984) – marijuana
 Where the Buffalo Roam (1980) – cannabis, cocaine and mescaline
 Where the Day Takes You (1992) – multiple drugs
 While We're Young (2015) – ayahuasca
 Who'll Stop the Rain (1978) – heroin
 Why Do Fools Fall in Love (1998)
 The Wild Angels (1966) – marijuana and heroin
 Wild in the Streets (1968) – LSD
 Winter's Bone (2010) – methamphetamine, cocaine, marijuana
 Withnail and I (1987) – cannabis, speed and other pills
 Without a Paddle (2004) – cannabis
 The Wolf of Wall Street (2013) – cocaine, crack cocaine, Quaaludes, and a mention of cannabis, Xanax and morphine
 Woodstock (1970) – cannabis, LSD, and other psychedelics
 Wonderland (2003) – cannabis, methamphetamine, cocaine, heroin, Quaaludes
 The Wonderland Experience (2002) – cannabis, LSD

Y 
 Y Tu Mamá También (2001) – marijuana
 Yellow Submarine (1968) - largely considered to be like an LSD trip
 The Young Nurses (1973) – cocaine
 Your Highness (2011) – an unnamed herb that cause hallucinations
 Youth In Revolt (2009) – marijuana, mushrooms

Z 
 Zapped! (1982) – marijuana
 Zombieland (2009) – marijuana

See also 
 List of films featuring hallucinogens
 List of films containing frequent marijuana use
 Works about drugs (category)
 :Category:Hood films

References

External links 
 Stoner movie genre

Further reading 
 

Drugs
 
Lists of films by common content